Past Lives – The Best of the RCA Years is a compilation released in 2007 by the British musical group Level 42. The compilation has the greatest songs of the period 1991-1996, in which the band was with the label RCA/BMG. All songs were released on the studio albums Guaranteed (1991) and ''Forever Now (1994).

Track listing
 "Past Lives" (1994) - (M.King/P.Gould) 5:39
 "Guaranteed" (1991) - (Lindup, Husband, King, Badarou) 4:51
 "Overtime" (1991) - (Lindup, King, Barfield) 4:47
 "My Father's Shoes" (1991) - (Lindup, King, Green, Badarou) 5:14
 "Forever Now" (1994) - (Musker/Darbyshire/King) - 4:14
 "All Over You" (1994) - (King/Lindup/Gould) - 4:02
 "Love In A Peaceful World" (1994) - (Gould/White) - 7:13
 "Model Friend" (1994) - (King/Lindup/P. Gould) - 4:56
 "Romance" (1994) - (King/Lindup/Gould) - 4:55
 "One In A Million" (1994) - (M.Lindup/P.Gould/W.Badarou/M.King) 4:56
 "Don't Bother Me" (1994) - (M.King/P.Gould) 4:57
 "Seven Years" (1991) - (King) 4:42
 "Lasso The Moon" (1991) - (Lindup, Green) 4:02
 "Set Me Up" (1991) - (Lindup, King, Barfield) 4:28
 "If You Were Mine" (1991) - (Husband) 5:01

Personnel
 Mark King - vocals/bass guitar
 Mike Lindup - keyboards/vocals
 Gary Husband - drums (tracks 2, 3, 4, 12, 13, 14 and 15)
 Phil Gould - drums (tracks 1, 5, 6, 7, 8, 9, 10 and 11)
 Allan Holdsworth - guitars (tracks 2, 3, 4, 12, 13, 14 and 15)
 Dominic Miller - guitars (tracks 2, 3, 4, 12, 13, 14 and 15)
 Danny Blume - guitars (tracks 1, 5, 6, 7, 8, 9, 10 and 11)
 Wally Badarou - keyboards

References

Level 42 albums
Albums produced by Wally Badarou
2007 greatest hits albums